Stomopteryx anxia is a moth of the family Gelechiidae. It was described by Edward Meyrick in 1917. It is found in South Africa.

The wingspan is 13 mm. The forewings are whitish ochreous with the costal and terminal edge finely sprinkled with black. The hindwings are grey, darker posteriorly.

References

Endemic moths of South Africa
Moths described in 1917
Stomopteryx